Jeffrey Allen Peterek (born September 22, 1963) is an American former professional baseball pitcher.

Career statistics

External links
, or Retrosheet, or Pura Pelota (Venezuelan Winter League)

1963 births
Living people
American expatriate baseball players in Mexico
Baseball players from Indiana
Beloit Brewers players
Denver Zephyrs players
El Paso Diablos players
Major League Baseball pitchers
Mary Hardin–Baylor Crusaders baseball players
Mexican League baseball pitchers
Milwaukee Brewers players
People from Michigan City, Indiana
Richmond Braves players
Stockton Ports players
Tecolotes de los Dos Laredos players
Tigres de Aragua players
American expatriate baseball players in Venezuela
Western Kentucky Hilltoppers baseball players